Frodeåsen is a hill just north of the town center of Tønsberg, Norway.

References

Tønsberg
Mountains of Vestfold og Telemark